The General Mining and Metallurgical Company SA, better known as LARCO (ΛΑΡΚΟ), is a ferro-nickel production company in Greece. It has mines in the region of Euboea, Neo Kokkino, Kastoria and Servia. The company also has a metallurgical plant in Larymna, which employs the majority of the company's employees.

LARCO was founded in 1963 by Prodromos Bodosakis-Athanasiadis, with headquarters in Marousi in Athens. In 1966, the construction of the factory in Larymna was completed and in 1968 the construction of a settlement for the workers and their families was completed. The mines of Euboea were fully exploited in 1969 and in 1972 two new electric furnaces were added. In 1977, Europe's first long-distance conveyor belt, with a length of 7.5 km, was installed to reduce the cost of transporting the ore by truck. The ore exploited by the company is the Nickel limonite. The deposits exploited by the company undergo surface mining (open pit method) while only 2% are mined underground. The final result is a granular, high purity, low carbon carbon ferric, which is used exclusively in the production of stainless steel and is transported from the port of Larymna.

References

External links

Manufacturing companies established in 1963
Manufacturing companies based in Athens
Greek brands
Steel companies of Greece
Greek companies established in 1963